"Don't Tell Me What to Do" is a song by Australian rock band Baby Animals. It was released in June 1993 as the first single from their second studio album Shaved and Dangerous (1993). The song peaked at number 24 on the ARIA Singles Chart.

Track listings
CD single (72787250402)
 "Don't Tell Me What to Do" – 4:11
 "Harmony Children" – 3:32

Charts

External links

References

1993 songs
1993 singles
Baby Animals songs
Songs written by Suze DeMarchi
Song recordings produced by Ed Stasium